The 1985 Pretty Polly Classic  was a women's tennis tournament played on indoor carpet court at the Brighton Centre in Brighton, England that was part of the 1985 Virginia Slims World Championship Series. It was the eighth edition of the tournament and was held from 21 October until 27 October 1985. First-seeded Chris Evert-Lloyd won the singles title and earned $32,000 first-prize money.

Finals

Singles
 Chris Evert-Lloyd defeated  Manuela Maleeva 7-5, 6-3
 It was Evert-Lloyd's 9th singles title of the year and the 141st of her career.

Doubles
 Lori McNeil /  Catherine Suire defeated  Barbara Potter /  Helena Suková 4–6, 7–6, 6–4

References

External links
 ITF tournament event details
 Tournament draws

Pretty Polly Classic
Brighton International
Pretty Polly Classic
Pretty Polly Classic